Alexy de la Cruz (born 11 December 1995) is a Dominican Republic boxer. He competed in the men's featherweight event at the 2020 Summer Olympics.

References

External links
 

1995 births
Living people
Dominican Republic male boxers
Olympic boxers of the Dominican Republic
Boxers at the 2020 Summer Olympics
AIBA World Boxing Championships medalists
Place of birth missing (living people)
Pan American Games bronze medalists for the Dominican Republic
Pan American Games medalists in boxing
Medalists at the 2019 Pan American Games
Boxers at the 2019 Pan American Games